Lengissa Bedane (born 7 December 1949) is an Ethiopian long-distance runner. He competed in the marathon at the 1972 Summer Olympics.

References

1949 births
Living people
Athletes (track and field) at the 1972 Summer Olympics
Ethiopian male long-distance runners
Ethiopian male marathon runners
Olympic athletes of Ethiopia
Place of birth missing (living people)
African Games medalists in athletics (track and field)
African Games silver medalists for Ethiopia
Athletes (track and field) at the 1973 All-Africa Games
20th-century Ethiopian people